Kanin-Sella Nevea is a joint Slovenian-Italian ski resort located on the slopes of Mt Kanin and Sella Nevea Pass at the Slovenian-Italian border. The nearest locality is Bovec about an hour away from the Slovene capital Ljubljana. On the Italian side, Tarvisio and Chiusaforte are the closest settlements. 

The Slovenian part of the Kanin Ski Resort was closed in 2013 though it was expected to be reopened in winter 2016/17.

Other activities
Cross country skiing (Log pod Mangartom, Letališče Bovec, Sella Nevea)
Sledding (5 km) & hiking

Ski slopes

External links
  - official site
 bovecskirental.com - Ski Rental Office in Bovec
  - Sella Nevea web site (Italian side)

Ski areas and resorts in Slovenia
Municipality of Bovec